Queulat National Park is a national park of Chile located in the Aysén del General Carlos Ibáñez del Campo Region. The park is bordered by the Cisnes River on the south side and is neighbor to Lago Rosselot National Reserve. It contains  of glacier-capped mountains and virgin evergreen forests.

History
In 1766, the Jesuit Father José García Alsue explored the area searching for the City of the Caesars.

Park geography
A portion of the Puyuhuapi Volcanic Group form part of the park, specifically the area south of the Lake Risopatrón. The main ice cap borders the northernmost part of the Puyuhuapi Channel called Ventisquero Sound.

Cascada de Ventisquero Colgante, a large waterfall, is located in the park. As the meltwaters of the eponymous glacier proceed into the Témpanos River, they fall down the waterfall's single vertical drop.

Other attractions in the park are the Queulat Sound, Father García and The Cóndor Falls, and Cat's Stone (Piedra del Gato).

Flora
A characteristic feature of this park is the presence of Valdivian temperate rain forests. In this wet environment typical trees include coihue and tepa. The understory vegetation consists of species such as tepú, quila, chilco and nalca (a plant with enormous leaves). At higher elevations, the forests are dominated by coigüe de Magallanes and lenga. The Carretera Austral runs through the middle of the park and includes a stretch of hairpin turns (Cuesta Queulat), along which can be observed altitudinal zones of vegetation in the park.

Fauna
In the southern portion of the park (Queulat mountain pass), wildlife includes mammals such as pudú, kodkod, and a variety of birds species including chucao tapaculo, Chilean pigeon, Magellanic woodpecker, black-throated huet-huet and thorn-tailed rayadito. The northern sections of the park are home to nearshore wildlife including semi-aquatic mammals as are southern river otter and coypu. Birds found in this area include Magellan goose, Chiloe wigeon, yellow-billed pintail, red shoveler, flying steamer duck, rosy-billed pochard, red-gartered coot, ringed kingfisher, great egret, cocoi heron, black-crowned night heron, torrent duck, sedge wren, Chilean flicker and black-necked swan.

References

External links

 CONAF: Parque Nacional Queulat

Protected areas of Aysén Region
National parks of Chile
Protected areas established in 1983
Valdivian temperate rainforest